The 1993–94 Ice hockey Bundesliga season was the 36th and final season of the Eishockey-Bundesliga, the top level of ice hockey in Germany. It was replaced by the Deutsche Eishockey Liga (DEL) for the 1994-95 season. 12 teams participated in the league, and EC Hedos Munchen won the championship.

First round

Play-downs

First round

Second round

Relegation

Playoffs

Quarterfinals

Semifinals

Final

References

External links
Season on hockeyarchives.info

Eishockey-Bundesliga seasons
Ger
1993–94 in German ice hockey